Casimir II of Belz (pl: Kazimierz II bełski; 1401/03 – 15 September 1442), was a Polish prince member of the House of Piast from the Masovian branch. He was a Duke of Płock, Rawa Mazowiecka, Gostynin, Sochaczew, Belz, Płońsk, Zawkrze and Wizna during 1426–1434 jointly with his brothers, and after the division of the paternal inheritance between him and his brothers in 1434, sole ruler over Belz.

He was the third son of Siemowit IV, Duke of Masovia and Alexandra of Lithuania, daughter of Algirdas.

Life
As a child, Casimir II was sent to Lithuania, an event that in the future would give him the support of the Grand Duke Vytautas. Also, he spend some time at the court of King Władysław II Jagiełło of Poland.

After 1420 Siemowit IV, due to his progressive blindness, gradually gave participation in the government to his adult sons. Casimir II and his older brother Siemowit V were formally named co-rulers. The first major challenge for Casimir II was the trip to Brest-Litovsk, where on 14 November 1425 he and his brother solemnly vowed to the crown his fidelity and acceptance in the recent controversy over the appointment of Stanisław z Pawłowic (former Chancellor of Siemowit IV) as Bishop of Płock.

Siemowit IV died on 21 January 1426 leaving his domains to his four sons: Siemowit V, Casimir II, Trojden II (d. 1427) and Władysław I (a fifth son, Alexander, followed a Church career). Not wanting to further weakened their positions and domains with subsequents divisions, they decided to co-rule all their paternal inheritance.

In accordance with their duties as Polish vassals, soon after they assumed the power went to Sandomierz, where on 8 September 1426 paid homage to King Władysław II. Surprisingly, Casimir II was absent in the ceremony, and also began to refuse the payment of the customary tribute in successive periods (among his notorious absences was in 1428 at Łęczyca). The Polish King began to fear that the refusal of one of the Masovian co-rulers to paid homage could give the others reasons to invalidate their feudal dependence. This situation could be maintained largely thanks to the support granted to Casimir II by the Lithuanian ruler Vytautas, who took up the prince on a campaign organized in 1428  against Veliky Novgorod. The unexpected illness and death of his protector Vytautas forced Casimir II to change his position: in September 1430 at Sandomierz and almost four years after his brothers, he finally paid homage to the Polish King.

In 1431 Casimir II, fulfilling his obligations as Polish vassal, arrived at the head of his troops to join King Władysław II in his fight against Švitrigaila. The Masovian prince didn't take part of the whole campaign, focusing on suppressed the riots of the Ruthenians, instigated by Švitrigaila's agents.

King Władysław II died on 1 June 1434, and this allowed to the Masovian rulers more freedom and flexibility in their government. In July 1434 Casimir II and Siemowit V arrived in Kraków, where they attended the coronation of the new Polish King, Władysław III.

On 31 August 1434 the sons of Siemowit IV finally decided to end their co-rulership and made the formal territorial division. On 31 December 1435, Casimir II (now Duke of Belz) signed the Peace of Brześć Kujawski. In the following years, Casimir II was focused in the government of his domains, who were in the Polish-Lithuanian border; this obviously originated conflicts between the Polish (mainly from Lesser Poland) nobility and Švitrigaila's magnates. The fights with varying degrees of success continued until 4 September 1437, where, in presence of Casimir II, the Polish nobles concluded at Lviv the final peace with Švitrigaila.

Three years later (1440), Casimir II also supported the expedition of Prince Casimir of Poland to Vilnius in order to obtain the title of Grand Duke of Lithuania.

In his internal politics, Casimir II made a gradual assimilation of the Red Ruthenia parts ruled by him and his brothers, into the Polish customs and laws. This involved, among others, the introduction of the Polish laws and administration.

On 26 June 1442 Casimir II married Margaret (d. 5 November 1464), a daughter of Castellan Vincent Szamotuły from Międzyrzecz. Unfortunately, the union was short-lived and childless: three months later, on 15 September 1442 Casimir II died in the village of Miączyn near Krasnystaw, victim of the plague. He was buried in the Masovian Ducal crypt at Płock Cathedral. His domains were inherited by his brother Władysław I.

References

Dukes of Masovia
1400s births
1442 deaths